North Western Province is a province of Sri Lanka, containing the Kurunegala District and Puttalam District. The following is a list of settlements in the province.



A
 Abakolawewa
 Abbowa
 Abokkagama
 Achari Hinukwewa
 Achari Ihalagama

B
 Baburugama
 Badabadda 
 Badabeddegama
 Badabeddewa
 Badagane
 Bakmeegolla

C
 Cement Factory
 Chandrayagama
 Chenaikudirippu
 Chenaikudiyirippu
 Chenakudiruppu
 Chettichena
 Chettisena
 Chettychena
 Chilan
 Chilaw

D
 Dabarayaya
 Dachchilanda
 Dadapolagama
 Dadapolagamuwa
 Dagama

E
 Ebawalapitiya
 Ebawalayaya
 Edandewela
 Edandupitiya
 Egalla

G
 Gaane 
 Gadolwaka
 Gahalagaswela
 Gahalagaswewa
 Gaiyala

H
 Habagama
 Habaragahamada
 Habarawa
 Habarawewa
 Habarewa

I
 Ibbagamuwa
 Ibbawela
 Ichchampitiya
 Ichchankadu
 Ichchankaudu

J
 Jagama
 Jahapagama
 Jakaduwa
 Jalatgama
 Jankurawela
 Jankure
 Jayalatgama
 Jayalathgama
 Jayarajapuraya
 Jayasirigama
 Jayasundaragedara 
 Jayasurigama

K
 Kaaradumunai
 Kabalewa
 Kachchakaduwa
 Kachcheri
 Kachchimadurankuli
 Kachchirawa

L
 Labugala
 Labuyaya
 Lakadagolla
 Landawatta
 Lankarangedara

M
 Mabo
 Mabopitiya
 Madadenigama
 Madadombe
 Madagama
 Maha Danvila
 Mawathagama

N
 Nabadapokuna
 Nabadawa
 Nabadawala
 Nabadawela
 Nabadawewa

O
 Obadakotuwa
 Obedagedere
 Obodakotuwa
 Odakkarai
 Oggamuwa

P
 Pabuluwa
 Pachchakadumundal
 Pachchalawela
 Pachchalawewa
 Pachchalewa

R
 Rachchiragama
 Rada Hilogama
 Rada Paliyagama 
 Rada Talanpola
 Radadena
 Ridigama

S
 Saidalapitiya 
 Saldalpitiya
 Samaderapitiyal
 Samagigama
 Samagiriyawewa

T
 Tabbomulla
 Tabbowa
 Tailagama
 Talagalla
 Talagaswewa

U
 Uda Horombuwa
 Uda Inguruwatta
 Uda Kahahena
 Uda Siyambalewa
 Uda Tammannewa

V
 Vairankattuwa 
 Vannativillu
 Vattakandal
 Velandikulama
 Velantikulam
 Velasiya
 Vellamundal
 Vellankarai
 Vicharanagama
 Vidatamunai
 Vidyalaya
 Viharegama
 Villuke
 Virakammandaluwa
 Viruthodai

W
 Wadakada
 Wadakahagala
 Wadakkarawewa
 Wadatta
 Wadawa
 Wadawa

See also
 List of cities in Sri Lanka
 List of towns in Sri Lanka

External links
 Cities and Towns in North Western Province, Sri Lanka

 
North Western Province
North Western Province